Tanjung Tuan (formerly known as Cape Rachado as named by the Portuguese, meaning 'broken cape') is an area in Alor Gajah District, Malacca, Malaysia. It is an exclave of Malacca adjacent to Port Dickson, Negeri Sembilan.

The cape is well known for the Cape Rachado Lighthouse facing the Strait of Malacca. The coastal area off the cape is famous as the site of the naval Battle of Cape Rachado in 1606, between the Dutch VOC and Portuguese fleets. The battle was the opening act for the series of conflicts between the Dutch-Johor coalition and Portuguese Malacca that ultimately ended with the Portuguese surrender of the city and fort of Malacca to the VOC in 1641.

Lighthouse 

After Portugal conquered Malacca in 1511, the Portuguese wanted to build a lighthouse to guide its ships. Tanjung Tuan was chosen and the cape was named Cape Rachado by them. Subsequently, a lighthouse was built between 1528 and 1529. As Malacca switched hands to the Dutch and later to the British in 1641 and 1824 respectively, so too did the possession of the structure.

Forest reserve 

In 1921, the area was gazetted as a permanent forest reserve under (No.Warta : 2066 bertarikh 23 Disember, 1921) with 809,700 square metres under the name of Hutan Simpanan Cape Rachado. However, in 1969 an area of 161,900 square metres was degazetted from the permanent forest reserve status for the purpose of public use (No.Warta : 328 bertarikh 25 Disember, 1969).

On 5 January 1971, The rest of the 607,000 square metres of the Cape Rachado forest reserves was gazetted as a wildlife sanctuary under the jurisdiction of PERHILITAN (forestry and wildlife protection department) under M.P.U.5 and PG No: 85 under the Birds and Wild Life Protection Ordinance, 1955 (Ordinan Perlindungan Binatang-Binatang Liar dan Burung-Burung, 1955).

On 16 April 1996, a company (Dataran Baiduri Sdn Bhd) was assigned to commercially develop the park.

This area has been designated by BirdLife International as an Important Bird Area. The Malaysian Nature Society is active in promoting conservation in the area.

Puncak Batu Putih in Cape Rachado is popular for hikers for short hiking experience during the weekend.

Burial Place
It has also believed that Tanjung Tuan is the place where Parameswara (1344 – c. 1414), the last king of Singapura and the founder of Malacca was buried. Parameswara was succeeded by his son, Megat Iskandar Shah who in turn ruled Malacca until 1424. There is an allegation that Parameswara had also been buried at the Bukit Larangan Park, Singapore. Some other also believe that he could have been cremated based on the Hindu's ritual belief system as people cannot find his actual buried place.

Further reading

Concerning the battle of Cape Rachado in 1606:

 Borschberg, Peter, Journal, Memorials and Letters of Cornelis Matelieff de Jonge. Security, Diplomacy and Commerce in 17th Century Southeast Asia, NUS Press, 2015. https://www.academia.edu/4302783
 Borschberg, Peter, The Singapore and Malacca Straits. Violence, Security and Diplomacy in the 17th Century, NUS Press, 2010. https://www.academia.edu/4302722
 Borschberg, Peter, "The value of Admiral Matelieff's writings for the history of Southeast Asia, c.1600–1620", Journal of Southeast Asian Studies, 48(3), pp. 414–435. DOI: https://doi.org/10.1017/S002246341700056X

See also
 List of tourist attractions in Malacca

Notes and references

Malacca State Forestry Department

Populated places in Malacca
Strait of Malacca
Important Bird Areas of Malaysia
Nature sites of Malaysia
Tourist attractions in Malacca
Enclaves and exclaves